Pareclectis mimetis is a moth of the family Gracillariidae. It is known from Mozambique.

References

Endemic fauna of Mozambique
Gracillariinae
Lepidoptera of Mozambique
Moths of Sub-Saharan Africa